There are scattered descriptions of early Finnish wars, conflicts involving the Finnish tribes, some of which took place before the Middle Ages. The earliest historical accounts of conflicts involving Finnish tribes, such as Tavastians, Karelians, Finns proper and Kvens, have survived in Icelandic sagas and in German, Norwegian, Danish and Russian chronicles as well as in Swedish legends and in Birch bark manuscripts. The most important sources are Novgorod First Chronicle, Primary Chronicle and Eric Chronicles.

Fortifications are known from Finland already from the Stone Age onwards. In Yli-Ii by the Iijoki river is located the Kierikki Stone Age fortress, which was built on piles and fortified with palisade. Also the approximately 40 Giant's Churches from the Neolithic period (3500–2000 BCE) found from the northwest coast of Finland may have served as fortifications. Bronze Age hillforts have also been found from Finland, such as Hautvuori in Laitila and Vanhalinna in Lieto. According to archeological finds belligerence and military hierarchy were emphasized in Finland in the Merovingian period. Hillforts get more common from Iron Age forward. According to the earliest historical documents in the Middle Ages Finnic tribes around the Baltic Sea were often in conflict with each other as well as against other entities in the area.

Oldest historical traces of conflicts in Finland are runestones GS 13 and U 582 which are dated to the early 11th century. Runestones are commemorating Vikings killed in Finland. Runestone G 319, which is dated to the early 13th century, also mentions Viking killed in Finland.

Early written sources 
Several medieval sagas, chronicles and other early historical sources mention wars and conflicts related to Finnish tribes and to Finland. Finland was probably the same as Terra Feminarum which was attacked by Sweden in the 1050s CE, as described in Gesta Hammaburgensis Ecclesiae Pontificum (Deeds of Bishops of the Hamburg Church) by Adam of Bremen in 1075. According to the source, the attack ended in the Swedish defeat, and led to the death of the king's son who was in charge of the campaign. Information on the conflict is however convoluted.

Ynglingasaga written in early 13th century describes military expedition to Finland at the end of the 4th century by the Swedish king Agne. However, it is disputed whether the Old Norse concept of Finland refers to the present country of Finland; alternatively it could have meant the land of the Sámi.

Orkneyinga saga written around 1230 tells about Nor who travelled from Kvenland to Norway and took over the entire country. Based on the saga's internal chronologies, the war would have taken place on the 6th or 7th century CE. Another version of the saga, Hversu Noregr byggdist, however omits the Kvenland part completely.

Norna-Gests þáttr saga from the early 14th century tells that Kvens (probably referring to a group of Finns) were raiding in Sweden in the mid-8th century. In the late 9th century, king Eric Anundsson was said to have conquered Finland, with several other eastern countries. However, all other accounts of the king exclude Finland from his conquests. Norwegian Ohthere tells in the Old English Orosius from 890 that Norwegians and Kvens (Qwenas) were in conflict with each other from time to time.

The best-known Swedish war against Finland presumably took place in the 1150s known as the legendary First Swedish Crusade.  Whether it ever actually happened, is however not certain as the information is based on the late 13th century legends. Sweden eventually took over Finland during the so-called Second Swedish Crusade around 1249 against Tavastians and the Third Swedish Crusade against Karelians in 1293. By the beginning of the 14th century, records of independent Finnish military activities ceased to surface.

Saga of Olaf Haraldson tells how the Saint Olaf himself, the King of Norway, plundered in Finland around 1008 and almost got killed at the Battle at Herdaler. Vague chronicle entries briefly mention Danish expeditions to Finland in the 1190s and 1202. Nothing is known about their results except what can be read from a papal letter from 1209 to the Archbishop of Lund which lets the reader understand the church in Finland be at least partly established by Danish efforts. According to Icelandic chronicles, Kvens were raiding in northern Norway in 1271.

Most of the historical sources mentioning Finns are the Finnish-Novogorodian wars described mainly in Novgorod First Chronicle and in the Primary Chronicle. Some of these conflicts are also described in Sofia First Chronicle, Nikon Chronicle and in Laurentian Codex. Finnic groups and the Republic of Novgorod waged a series of wars between the 11th and 14th centuries. They probably contributed to the Finns' eventual subjugation to the Catholic Church and the Kingdom of Sweden.

List of early Finnish wars and conflicts

References

See also

 List of Finnish wars